Óscar B. Gans y López Martínez (12 May 1903 – 7 December 1965) was a Cuban attorney and politician.  He served as Foreign Minister and later as Prime Minister of Cuba during the administration of Carlos Prio.

He was married to Sara María Gutiérrez and they had one child, Manuel Gans Gutiérrez.

References

  (Spanish)

Foreign ministers of Cuba
Prime Ministers of Cuba
1903 births
1965 deaths
People from Havana
Ambassadors of Cuba to the United States
1950s in Cuba
20th-century Cuban lawyers
20th-century Cuban politicians